Cladara atroliturata, the scribbler, is a moth in the family Geometridae. The species was first described by Francis Walker in 1863. It is found in North America.

The MONA or Hodges number for Cladara atroliturata is 7639.

References

Further reading

External links

 

Larentiinae
Articles created by Qbugbot
Moths described in 1863